Świątki is a village in Olsztyn County, Warmian-Masurian Voivodeship, in northern Poland. It is the seat of the gmina (administrative district) called Gmina Świątki.

The village has a population of 938.

References

Villages in Olsztyn County